Max Ascoli (1898–1978) was a Jewish Italian-American professor of political philosophy and law at the New School for Social Research, United States of America.

Career 
Ascoli's career started in Italy and continued in the United States.

Background 
Ascoli was born in Ferrara, Italy on June 25, 1898, into an Italian Jewish family.  He was the only child of Enrico Ascoli, a coal and lumber merchant, and Adriana Finzi.  In 1920, he graduated in Law from the University of Ferrara.  In 1921, he published a critical study of French socialist Georges Sorel. In 1924, he published a biography of philosopher Benedetto Croce.  In 1928, he graduated in Philosophy from the University of Rome.

Italy 
In 1928, Ascoli held the chair of Philosophy of Law at the University of Rome, but he was arrested.

In 1929, he accepted a post at the University of Cagliari (Sardinia).  His opposition to the Italian fascist regime, however, led him into exile.

United States 
In 1931, Ascoli received a Rockefeller Foundation scholarship and moved to the United States.  In 1939, he became an American citizen.

Ascoli met Alvin Johnson during his time with the Rockefeller Foundation and later joined the New School for Social Research that Johnson co-founded in New York. He was active in the Mazzini Society, an anti-fascist organization founded in 1939 by Italian intellectuals who had fled fascist Italy. Ascoli founded a number of other important cultural organizations in the US, including the Handicrafts Development Incorporated, a private organization that helped artists and artisans in Italy.

His work with CADMA (Committee for the Assistance and Distribution of Materials to Artisans), which was headed by theorist and art critic Carlo Ludovico Ragghianti, and the House of Italian Handicraft supported the 1950-53 partially US-Government funded exhibition Italy at Work: Her Renaissance in Design Today co-curated by Meyric R. Rogers and Charles Nagel, Jr.

For many years, Ascoli taught at the New School for Social Research, becoming dean of the Graduate School (1939–41).  He left the New School to serve the government for two years under Nelson A. Rockefeller, then Coordinator of Inter-American Affairs.  He then went on to focus on a new magazine. 

During the course of his career, Ascoli would teach at a number of prominent US institutions: Yale, Columbia, Chicago, North Carolina, and Harvard.

The Reporter 
In 1949, Ascoli joined James Reston to found The Reporter (magazine), an influential, liberal magazine for some two decades (1949-1968).  Its circulation peaked at 215,000 readers.  In 1968, Ascoli merged the publication with Harper’s Magazine.

Contributors included:  Dean Acheson, James Baldwin, McGeorge Bundy, Isaac Deutscher, Theodore Draper, John Kenneth Galbraith, Gertrude Himmelfarb, Irving Howe, Henry Kissinger, Irving Kristol, Boris Pasternak, Eugene V. Rostow, Arthur Schlesinger, Jr., Peter Viereck, and Edmund Wilson.

Personal life and death 
Ascoli was married twice.  His first wife was Italian poet Anna Maria Cochetti (who wrote under the pen name Anna Maria Armi); he divorced her in 1940.  His second wife was Marion Rosenwald Ascoli, whom he married in 1940. Marion was the daughter of CEO of the Sears, Roebuck and Company, Julius Rosenwald. (She was also previously married to Alfred K. Stern, whom she divorced in 1936.)  She had been chairwoman and president of the Citizens Committee for Children of New York and previously  president of the New York Fund for Children and of the Northside Center for Child Development in Harlem.  Marion Ascoli died in 1990, aged 88.  Their son is Peter Ascoli, author of Julius Rosenwald, a book about his maternal grandfather.

Ascoli died after a long illness at his home in Manhattan on January 1, 1978, at the age of 79.

Works 
The Immigration History Research Center Archives, University of Minnesota Libraries, houses Max Ascoli's papers.

His books include criticism of Italian fascist Corporatism.

Books written 
 Vie dalla Croce (1924)
 Saggi Vichiani (1928)
 Gíustizia:  Saggio di Filosofia del Diritto (1930)
 Intelligence in Politics (1936)
 Fascism:  Who Benefits? (1939)
 War Aims and America's Aims (1941)
 Power of Freedom (1949)

Books co-written 
 Fascism for Whom? with Arthur Feiler (1938)

Books edited 
 Political and Economic Democracy, edited by Max Ascoli and Fritz Lehmann (1937)
 Fall of Mussolini, His Own Story, translated from the Italian by Francis Frenaye, edited and with a preface by Max Ascoli (1948)
 Reporter Reader (1956)
 Our Times:  The Best from the Reporter (1960)
 Reporter Reader (1969)

Articles 
 Articles for Foreign Affairs (magazine)

See also 
The Reporter (magazine)

References

Sources

External links 

 Max Ascoli papers at the Immigration History Research Center Archives, University of Minnesota Libraries.

1898 births
1978 deaths
Sapienza University of Rome alumni
University of Ferrara alumni
Academic staff of the University of Cagliari
The New School faculty
Italian exiles
Italian emigrants to the United States